Datuk Nicol Ann David  (born August 26, 1983) is a retired female Malaysian professional squash player. Beginning in August 2006, David was the world number one for a record-breaking 108 consecutive months, finally ceding the ranking in September 2015 to Raneem El Weleily. She has won the World Open title a record 8 times in 2005, 2006, 2008, 2009, 2010, 2011, 2012 and 2014, as well as the British Open title in 2005, 2006, 2008, 2012 and 2014. In July 2016, she reached her 151st successive month in the top 10, breaking the record in both men's and women's categories. She surpassed Peter Nicol's previous records of 150 months.

David is the first squash player to have won the World Junior title twice; in 1999 and 2001 under the tutelage of Richard Glanfield. She remained the only female squash player to have achieved this, until Raneem El Weleily emulated David's feat by winning her second World Junior Championship in 2007. David joined WISPA and turned professional in 2000 when she won her first WISPA title, after only a month on the tour. The victory came in February, when she defeated Salma Shabana in the final of the Savcor Finnish Open. On 7 June 2008, David was honoured with the Order of Merit (Darjah Bakti) or D.B. in conjunction with the birthday of the His Majesty Tuanku Mizan Zainal Abidin. She was the first recipient of the award which was established on 26 June 1975. David was also invited to carry the Olympic torch for Malaysia during the build up to the Athens Olympics in 2004 and being appointed as UNDP National Goodwill Ambassador for Malaysia.

Considered by some to be the greatest women's squash player of all time, David's other notable achievements include the Asian Squash Championship, which she won a record nine times (in 1998, 2000, 2002, 2004, 2006, 2008, 2010, 2011 and 2015). She also held a 13-month, 51-match winning streak, from March 2006 until April 2007, when she finally lost to Natalie Grinham in the final of the 2007 Seoul Open. David has also obtained the WSA Player of the Year on seven occasions, 2005–2010 and 2012. In a poll conducted in 2018 by the Professional Squash Association (PSA), David was voted by fans as the greatest squash player of all-time in the women's category. In February 2019, Nicol announced her retirement plan, and decided to retire at the end of the 2018/2019 PSA season in June. In another poll conducted by the World Games in 2021, David was crowned as the World Games Greatest Athlete of All Time with receiving a total of 318,943 votes and being the only Malaysian and Asian athlete among 24 candidates.

Personal life 
Born in Penang, David is the daughter of Ann Marie David, a retired Malaysian Chinese school teacher of Hokkien-Hakka descent and Desmond David, a Malaysian Indian engineer of Tamil descent, who is also a former state athlete and footballer. She has two sisters, Lianne and Cheryl, both of whom are accomplished squash players at the national level. As a youngster, mathematics was David's best subject at school; she dreamed of one day becoming an engineer. Her primary education was at Sekolah Kebangsaan Convent Green Lane (Convent Green Lane Primary School). David scored seven As in her Penilaian Menengah Rendah (PMR) and obtained seven As in her Sijil Pelajaran Malaysia (SPM); the equivalent to GCSE, which she studied at Convent Green Lane Secondary School in Green Lane, Penang. She was raised a Roman Catholic.

Squash career

Pre–2000: Junior years 

David played squash when she was five years old, and received coaching at the age of eight. While training at the Bukit Dumbar Squash Centre, David was talent spotted by Ee Phoeh Hoon, who led her to represent her home state of Penang, along with her sisters. David's squash career began in 1992 when she won silver in the Under-14 category of the Penang State Junior Championship. Her first national level victory was also in 1992 at the Milo-Dunlop Sport National Junior Interstate Championship, where she won silver in the Under-16 category. In 1994, David was chosen to join the Penang state squash team for the Malaysian Games (SUKMA) tournament where she helped Penang win a gold medal in the team event, despite being ill at the time. In the same year, she won her first two international titles – the Hong Kong U-13 and the Scottish Junior Open Under-12.

David won the Women's World Junior Squash Championships of 1999 beating her compatriot Lynn Leong in the final in Antwerp, Belgium, making her the youngest woman to become the world junior champion at the age of 15. In the process, she defeated three players ranked in the world top 20. She successfully defended the title in Penang in 2001, becoming one of only two players in the history of squash to have won it twice; her coach was Richard Glanfield.

In 1999, David began to win major junior tournaments, including the British Junior Open (Under-17 champion), the German Junior Open (Under-19, Champion), the SEA Games (Champion in the Senior and Team categories), and the Asian Junior Champion for both individual and team events.

David's biggest win, however, was the World Junior Championships, played in Antwerp. It took just half an hour for the then 15-year-old Malaysian schoolgirl to obtain world junior champion status when she beat compatriot Leong Siu Lynn 9–5, 9–3 and 9–2 in the final of the women's individual event to become the youngest ever winner of the title. David reached the quarterfinals of the previous World Junior Championships in August 1997 in Brazil, as a thirteen-year-old and has since claimed both the Asian junior and senior titles, as well as the gold medal in the Asian Games in December 1998. David also is one of a few squash player to have won all the age categories in the British Junior  Open.

2000–2004: Early professional career 

David joined WISPA and turned professional in 2000 when she won her first WISPA title, after only a month in the tour. The victory came in February, when she defeated Salma Shabana in the final of the Savcor Finnish Open with a score of 9–1, 9–0 and 9–5. Within a month, Hotel Equatorial announced its two-year worldwide sponsorship for her. David also won a sponsorship on the WISPA tour by Dunlop squash.

In 2001, David, who has played under Dunlop Sport sponsorship for most of her junior career and WISPA career, signed a two-year deal to play with Head rackets with local conglomerate Mulpha Sports. In July, David won the World Junior title for a second time, beating Omneya Abdel Kawy in just 17 minutes with a score of 9–2, 9–4 and 9–2 in the final. She remained the only female squash player to have achieved this until 2007, when Raneem El Weleily won her second World Junior Championship. David also won the individual event in the Asian Junior Squash Championships by defeating her compatriot Tricia Chuah in the final with a score of 9–5, 9–6 and 9–0; and helped the Malaysian team to the team event title.

In 2002 David, together with her mixed double event partner Ong Beng Hee, won a Commonwealth Games silver medal for Malaysia after losing to Glen Wilson and Leilani Rorani in the final. Earlier in the year, David defeated Ellen Petersen of Denmark with a score of 9–2, 9–7, 8–10, 9–4 to win the second Kuala Lumpur Open title of her career. David failed to retain her Asian Games gold medal in 2002, when she lost 9–7, 9–5 and 9–7 to Rebecca Chiu of Hong Kong in the final in Busan, South Korea.

David was the losing finalist twice in 2003, losing to the more experienced Cassie Jackman on her home ground and then to Linda Elriani in the Monte Carlo Classic in November. She reached the semi-final of the World Open in Hong Kong, losing to Cassie Jackman with a score of 9–6, 9–3, 9–4 in the final. David did not perform well in the other major WISPA events; she was eliminated in the first round of the Carol Weymuller US Open, in the British Open and in the Texas Open. In the Qatar Classic Open, David lost in the second round to Natalie Grinham with a score of 9–2, 7–9, 9–0 and 9–4.

In 2004 David again failed to win any title. Her achievements included getting into the final of both the Kuala Lumpur Open and the Malaysian Open. David started to progress in the very last month of the year by reaching the final of the Shanghai WISPA WorldStars Championship and the semi-finals of the World Open, to rise two places to number four in the January 2005 WISPA rankings.

2005–2006: World champion and rise to the top 

Defeated only twice in 2005, the 21-year-old from Penang returned to her home country in July after winning the gold medal at the World Games in Germany. she then became the first local player to win the Women's CIMB Malaysian Open Squash Championship title in the event’s 31-year history. In October, David proved that her success in the World Games and in the Malaysian Open was not by chance by becoming the first Malaysian to win a British Open title, the first Asian to win the women's crown, when she beat Australia's Natalie Grinham in the women's final in straight games that lasted in 55 minutes. Within two months after the British Open and the World Games win, David won the World Open in Hong Kong for the first time and  world number one ranking for the first time in January 2006. Later in the year, she was voted by her fellow members of the Women's International Squash Players Association as the WISPA Player of The Year 2005. David became the World's number 1 female squash player in January 2006 at the age of 23 to become the first Malaysian and the first Asian woman to be ranked World number 1 in the sport. She also became the twelfth holder of the position since the rankings were first produced in April 1983. David started the year on a low, losing twice to Vanessa Atkinson in February, in the Apawamis Open and in the Kuala Lumpur Open, both in the final. The two straight loses to Atkinson saw David's world rank dropped to number 2. David started to show progress later in the year and recovered from the setback to win six straight tour titles and reclaimed the World number 1 spot. David successfully defended her World Open title on 25 November 2006, at the Ulster Hall in Belfast by defeating Natalie Grinham in the final that was said to be "one of the great finals of the Women’s World Open". She became the first Malaysian athlete to win a world championship title for the second consecutive time, and the fourth person in history to retain the World Open Squash Championship. David also captured the Qatar Airways Challenge Open, the Dunlop British Open Championship, the Hong Kong Open, the Penang Open and the CIMB Malaysian Open. David topped the December WISPA ranking with a points average of almost twice that of her nearest rival, Rachael Grinham, and in the same month, in the second annual WISPA Awards, she was voted best female player of the year for the second time.

2007–2008: Winning streak and dominance 

David captured another six titles in the early months of 2007, then lost the final of the British Open to Australian Rachael Grinham in a five set final lasting 87 minutes. A month later, David again failed to defend her World Open title when she stumbled in the second round, losing to Shelley Kitchen with a score of 0–9, 1–9, 9–2, 9–3 and 6–9 in 69 minutes. It was the first time since April 2004 that David did not qualify for the quarters of a tournament,  losing to the same person who denied her the bronze medal of the Commonwealth Games in Melbourne 9 months previously. In December, David won the inaugural Asian Sportswoman of the Year, beating more than 100 competitors who represented 25 sporting bodies.

In 2008, David won ten tour titles and was unbeaten. David completed her most successful year to date, retaining her Cathay Pacific Hong Kong Open title for the third successive year in November to bring her 2008 WISPA World Tour title total to ten, extending her unbeaten Tour record since October 2007 to 53 matches. David celebrated her second full calendar year as world number one in the December Women's World Squash Rankings thus bringing her reign at the top of women’s squash to 30 straight months. David's WISPA title successes in 2008 began with the Apawamis Open in New York in February, and continued with the KL Open on home soil in Malaysia, the British Open title in England, Seoul Open in South Korea, Malaysian Open, the Singapore Masters, Dutch Open, World Open in England, Qatar Classic and the Hong Kong Open. Away from the tour, David secured her sixth successive biennial Asian Championship crown in February, after winning the first in July 1998 when aged just 14, and then lead Malaysia to the bronze medal in the Women's World Team Championship in Cairo.

2009–present: Achieving records 

With a lead over her nearest rival, she led in the  Women's World Squash Rankings published on 1 January 2009 by the Women's International Squash Players' Association (WISPA) – thus moving into her 30th successive month as the world’s number one female player. David headed an unchanged top four, with Natalie Grinham (Netherlands) at No. 2; her older sister Rachael Grinham (Australia) at No. 3; and Natalie Grainger, of the United States, at No. 4. In her first tournament of the year, the Kuala Lumpur Open, David's 17-month, 56-match winning run was brought to an end when she lost to Natalie Grainger in the final. After the defeat, David recovered to capture the inaugural Cayman Islands Open. She managed to avenge her loss to Grainger early in the year by beating her 11–8, 11–6 and 11–5 in the final. It is her 35th tour crown and her 50th appearance in a WISPA Tour final. A week later, David went on to win her second title of the year by again dispatching Grainger, this time in four sets.

Twenty-one days after winning the Texas Open title, David captured her second Seoul City Open crown by defeating Jenny Duncalf in four sets. A month later, on 24 July, she retained her World Games women's singles title with a win over archrival Natalie Grinham of the Netherlands in straight sets. A week later, on 1 August, David picked up her fifth consecutive Malaysian Open title, winning 11–6, 11–8, 9–11, 11–7 in a 60-minute match against 25-year-old Londoner, Alison Waters. David thus became the first player to win five Malaysian Open titles in a row since its inception in 1975.

Dominating on the squash courts, David beat Natalie Grinham to win her third consecutive Singapore Masters championship, and her third title within a month. She overcame Natalie in three sets with a score of 11–9, 11–8 and 11–9 for her fifth WISPA title of the year. David celebrated another milestone in her squash career by moving into her 41st month as world number one in the September Women's World Rankings thus surpassing her mentor Sarah Fitz-Gerald as the player with the third longest ever reign at the top of the women's rankings. On 12 September, David lost to Madeline Perry in the British Open quarter-final in a five set match that lasted for 76 minutes; 15 days later, she recovered to defeat  arch-rival Natalie Grinham in the final of the World Open Championship, obtaining the title for a record fourth time. David ended the year on a low when she lost in the semis to Jenny Duncalf in both the Qatar Classic and the US Open, the former ending in five sets.

David started 2010 ranked number 1 for the 42nd consecutive month. She appeared in the WISPA calendar for the month of January. David competed in her first tournament in March, the US$53,000 Chennai Open; she won all her matches in straight sets and was crowned as the champion, avenging two straight defeats to Jenny Duncalf in late 2009. Thirteen days later, in the Kuala Lumpur Open, David defeated the fourth seeded Egyptian Omneya Abdel Kawy who upset second seed Jenny Duncalf in the semi-finals in straight sets to win her second successive WISPA title of the year. It was David's sixth title in the Kuala Lumpur Open tournament as she had previously won it in 2000, 2002, 2005, 2007 and 2008.

David had won five more tour titles since April. This include winning the "prestigious" World Open title on 22 September. The World Open win was David fifth thus equalling Sarah Fitz-Gerald's record for the most times World Open win. In October, in the women's singles final of the 2010 Commonwealth Games in Delhi, David defeated Jenny Duncalf 11–3, 11–5, 11–7 in 40 minutes to win the gold medal. David did not drop a game in the entire tournament, just as she did in the 2010 World Open in Egypt.

Nicol David added another feather to her cap, becoming the first player – male or female – to win the US Open for the third straight year. The 31-year-old Nicol, a seven-time world champion and five-time British Open winner, exacted sweet revenge over Egyptian teenager Nour El Sherbini to win the US$115,000 (RM479,320) tournament in Philadelphia.

Rivalry between David and Natalie Grinham 

David and Natalie Grinham have a long rivalry history. As of March 2012, they have met 36 times, with David leading their overall head-to-head series 29–7. Grinham is David's most frequent opponent on tour and 16 of their matches have been in tournament finals, including two in the World Open tournament. The World Open 2006 final between David and Grinham was said to be "one of the great finals of the Women’s World Open".

The longest match between the duo is in the 2007 CIMB Kuala Lumpur Open;  which saw David went on to win in a five set match that lasted in 102  minutes. David won 6–9, 9–3, 9–6, 7–9, 9–6. On 27 September 2009 in the $118,000 2009 Women's World Open final, David won the match in four sets 3–11, 11–6, 11–3, 11–8 to become only the third player in the history of the championships to win four titles, alongside Australia's Sarah Fitz-Gerald and New Zealander Susan Devoy.

Career statistics

WISPA titles (81) 
All results for David in WISPA World Tour tournaments:

WISPA finals (runner-up) (21)

World Open

Finals: 8 (8 titles, 0 runner-up)
Source:

Major World Series final appearances

British Open: 7 finals (5 titles, 2 runner-up)

Hong Kong Open: 10 finals (10 titles, 0 runner-up)

Qatar Classic: 5 finals (5 titles, 0 runner-up)

Malaysian Open: 11 finals (8 titles, 3 runner-up)

Other titles 
1998 Asian Championship – Singles Champion (1), Asian Games – Singles Gold (1)

2000 Asian Championship – Singles Champion (2)

2002 Asian Championship – Singles Champion (3), Asian Championship – Team Champion (1), Asian Games – Singles Silver, Commonwealth Games – Mixed Doubles Silver

2004 Asian Championship – Singles Champion (4), Asian Championship – Team Champion (2)

2005 World Games – Singles Champion (1)

2006 Asian Championship – Singles Champion (5), Asian Championship – Team Champion (3), Asian Games – Singles Gold (2)

2008 Asian Championship – Singles Champion (6), Asian Championship – Team Champion (4)

2009 World Games – Singles Champion (2)

2010 Asian Championship – Singles Champion (7), Asian Games – Singles Gold (3), Asian Games – Team Gold (1), Commonwealth Games – Singles Gold (1), Commonwealth Games – Mixed Doubles Bronze

2011 Asian Championship – Singles Champion (8)

2013 World Games – Singles Champion (3)

2014 Asian Championship – Team Champion (5), Asian Games – Singles Gold (4), Asian Games – Team Gold (2), Commonwealth Games – Singles Gold (2)

2015 Asian Championship – Singles Champion (9)

2018 Asian Games – Singles Gold (5)

Junior titles 
1995 Scottish Junior Open – Under-14 Champion

1996 British Junior Open – Under-14 Champion, Scottish Junior Open – Under-14 Champion

1997 British Junior Open – Under-14 Champion, Scottish Junior Open – Under-16 Champion, Australian Junior Open – Under-15 Champion, Australian Junior Open – Under-17 Champion

1998 British Junior Open – Under-16 Champion, Scottish Junior Open – Under-17 Champion, Asian Junior Squash Grand Circuit Final – Under-19 Champion

1999 World Junior Champion (1), British Junior Open – Under-17 Champion, British Junior Open – Under-19 Champion, Asian Junior Championship – Singles Champion (1), Asian Junior Championship – Team Champion (1), German Junior Open – Champion, Malaysian Junior Open – Champion

2001 World Junior Champion (2), Asian Junior Championship – Singles Champion (2), Asian Junior Championship – Team Champion (2)

Singles performance timeline 

To prevent confusion and double counting, information in this table is updated only once a tournament or the player's participation in the tournament has concluded.

Note: NA = Not Available

Awards and recognition 
On 7 June 2008, David was honoured with the Order of Merit (Darjah Bakti) or D.B. in conjunction with the birthday of His Majesty Tuanku Mizan Zainal Abidin. She was the first recipient of the award which was established on 26 June 1975. The award is limited to 10 recipients who have made significant contributions in the arts, sciences and the humanities.
 
On 12 July 2008, David was among 497 people honoured in conjunction with the 70th birthday of the Penang State Governor Tun Abdul Rahman Abbas. David was also one of the 28 people who received the Darjah Setia Pangkuan Negeri award (DSPN), which carries the title Datuk, making her the youngest person ever to be conferred Datukship in Penang. The former Prime Minister of Malaysia Tun Abdullah Ahmad Badawi, a fellow Penangite, once quipped that David is "now more famous than me". In July 2007, David received Master of Arts honoris causa; an honorary degree by the University of Nottingham. David has also obtained the WISPA Player of the Year on six consecutive occasions, from 2005 until 2010.

David was given the honour of carrying the Olympic torch for Malaysia during the build up to the Athens Olympics of 2004, and was appointed UNDP National Goodwill Ambassador for Malaysia.

On 23 September 2019, David was conferred with an Honorary Doctorate (Ph.D.) in Sports Science by Universiti Sains Malaysia (USM).

Honours

Honours of Malaysia 
  :
  Officer of the Order of the Defender of the Realm (KMN) (2006)
  Order of Merit (DB) (2008)
  Member of the Order of the Defender of the Realm (AMN) (2009)
  Commander of the Order of Meritorious Service (PJN) - Datuk (2017)
  :
  Officer of the Order of the Defender of State (DSPN) - Dato' (2008)

In popular culture
The ACE Pictures has on 7 June 2021 announced a biopic in English based on David's life story titled 'I am Nicol David' will soon be produced.

See also 
 Official Women's Squash World Ranking
 List of WISPA number 1 ranked players
 WISPA Awards
 British Open Squash Championships
 British Junior Open Squash

Notes 

  Natalie Grinham switched allegiance to the Netherlands from March 2008 onwards.
  H represents hour while MM represents minutes.
  WISPA tournament uses PAR scoring from 21 July 2008 onwards.

References

External links 

 
 Squash Stars
 
 
 
 Malaysia’s Résumé – Datuk Nicol Ann David

1983 births
Living people
People from Penang
Malaysian female squash players
Malaysian sportswomen
Malaysian people of Indian descent
Malaysian people of Chinese descent
Malaysian Roman Catholics
Malaysian socialites
Commonwealth Games medallists in squash
Commonwealth Games gold medallists for Malaysia
Commonwealth Games silver medallists for Malaysia
Commonwealth Games bronze medallists for Malaysia
Squash players at the 1998 Commonwealth Games
Squash players at the 2002 Commonwealth Games
Squash players at the 2006 Commonwealth Games
Squash players at the 2010 Commonwealth Games
Squash players at the 2014 Commonwealth Games
Asian Games gold medalists for Malaysia
Asian Games silver medalists for Malaysia
Asian Games bronze medalists for Malaysia
Asian Games medalists in squash
Squash players at the 1998 Asian Games
Squash players at the 2002 Asian Games
Squash players at the 2006 Asian Games
Squash players at the 2010 Asian Games
Squash players at the 2014 Asian Games
Squash players at the 2018 Asian Games
Medalists at the 1998 Asian Games
Medalists at the 2002 Asian Games
Medalists at the 2006 Asian Games
Medalists at the 2010 Asian Games
Medalists at the 2014 Asian Games
Medalists at the 2018 Asian Games
World Games gold medalists
Sportspeople from Penang
Recipients of the Order of Merit of Malaysia
Commanders of the Order of Meritorious Service
Officers of the Order of the Defender of the Realm
Members of the Order of the Defender of the Realm
World Games bronze medalists
Competitors at the 2009 World Games
Competitors at the 2013 World Games
Competitors at the 2017 World Games
Competitors at the 2005 World Games
Squash players at the 2018 Commonwealth Games
Southeast Asian Games medalists in squash
Southeast Asian Games gold medalists for Malaysia
Competitors at the 2001 Southeast Asian Games
World Games medalists in squash
Medallists at the 2002 Commonwealth Games
Medallists at the 2010 Commonwealth Games
Medallists at the 2014 Commonwealth Games